Shizuka Miyaji (born 4 November 1981) is a Japanese woman cricketer. She was also the part of the Japanese cricket team which secured the bronze medal at the 2010 Asian Games which was held in China defeating the China women's national cricket team in the 3rd place playoff.

Shizuka made her One Day International debut for Japan at the 2011 Women's Cricket World Cup Qualifier. She also captained the Japanese cricket team at the 2013 ICC Women's World Twenty20 Qualifier. In April 2019, she was named in Japan's squad for the 2019 ICC Women's Qualifier EAP tournament in Vanuatu. She made her Women's Twenty20 International (WT20I) debut for Japan against Indonesia in the Women's Qualifier EAP tournament on 6 May 2019.

References

Further reading

External links 

Profile at Japanese Cricket Association
Profile at CricHQ

1981 births
Living people
Japanese women cricketers
Japan women Twenty20 International cricketers
Asian Games bronze medalists for Japan
Asian Games medalists in cricket
Cricketers at the 2010 Asian Games
Cricketers at the 2014 Asian Games
Medalists at the 2010 Asian Games
People from Nishinomiya